For the 1941 Vuelta a España, the field consisted of 32 riders; 16 finished the race.

By rider

References

1941 Vuelta a España
1941